Pietà or Dead Christ Supported by Angels is a tempera on panel painting by Giovanni Bellini, now in the city museum of Rimini. It is dated to around 1470, making it one of his early mature works, around the same time as another of his Pietà (Brera).

Bibliography 
  Mariolina Olivari, Giovanni Bellini, in AA.VV., Pittori del Rinascimento, Scala, Firenze 2007. 

Paintings by Giovanni Bellini
1470 paintings